is an original net animation (ONA) anime series created by Production I.G and Kazuto Nakazawa. The series premiered on March 2, 2018, worldwide on Netflix.

A second season, titled , premiered on March 18, 2021.

Premise
In a world powered by advanced technology, crime, and action sweep through the archipelagic nation of Cremona, (inspired by the real city of Cremona in Italy, and other cities of Lombardy such as Milan). Chief among the major players is "Killer B", a vigilante serial killer who has thrown the city into chaos. The stories of the protagonist Koku; Keith, a legendary investigator of the Royal Investigation Service (RIS); and a mysterious criminal organization intertwine on the path to reach their objectives.

Koku is a demihuman with the ability to shape-shift parts of his body into wings and blades. Attempting to save his childhood friend Yuna, Keith Flick is attempting to solve the murder of his sister 8 years ago. Both of them are up against the Market Maker, a hidden organization that controls the government of the island to understand the magical powers that Koku has and where they came from.

Voice cast

Production
Netflix announced the series on February 24, 2016, stating that the series would air 12 episodes and debut in 190 countries around the world. It was originally titled Perfect Bones. The title was later revealed to be B: The Beginning. Kazuto Nakazawa directed the series and designed the characters while also serving as key animation supervisor, Yoshinobu Yamakawa also directed the series alongside Nakazawa, Katsuya Ishida wrote the scripts, and Yoshihiro Ike composed the music.

The theme song "The Perfect World" was performed by Marty Friedman in collaboration with Man with a Mission's vocalist Jean-Ken Johnny, bass guitarist KenKen, and Kōji Fujimoto. The series premiered on March 2, 2018.

Anime Limited acquired the series for home video distribution in the United Kingdom and Ireland. It was announced on May 30 in the Anime Matsuri Panel that it'll also see a North American release. Shout! Factory would co-distribute it. It was released on October 2, 2020.

During the 2018 Annecy International Animated Film Festival, Netflix announced that a second season is in production. The second season, titled B: Succession, was released on March 18, 2021. Itsuro Kawasaki is directing the series, with Kazuto Nakazawa serving as chief director, and the rest of the staff and cast are reprising their roles.

Episodes

Season 1: The Beginning (2018)

Season 2: Succession (2021)

Notes

References

External links
  
  on Netflix
 

2018 anime ONAs
Anime with original screenplays
Japanese adult animated science fiction television series
Japanese-language Netflix original programming
Netflix original anime
Production I.G
Psychological thriller anime and manga
Science fiction anime and manga
Suspense anime and manga